Kulung (Wurkum) is a minor West Chadic language of Karim Lamido LGA, Taraba State, Nigeria that was recently discovered by Roger Blench. The language is not reported in Ethnologue or Glottolog. Blench (2019) gives a rough estimate of about 2,000 speakers.

Kulung speakers consider themselves to be ethnically part of the larger Jarawan Bantu-speaking Kulung, although their language is West Chadic and related to Piya. The language exhibits considerable Jarawan influence but retains its Chadic character.

References

West Chadic languages
Languages of Nigeria